Mark Moiseevich Stolberg (1922 in Rostov-on-Don – 16 May 1942 in Novorossiysk) was a Russian chess master.

Stolberg won the Rostov-on-Don City championship in 1938. The next year he finished in second place in a Soviet master candidates tournament. In 1940, Stolberg shared first place with Eduard Gerstenfeld in Kiev (the 12th USSR-ch semi-final), and tied for 13-16th in Moscow (the 12th USSR Chess Championship won jointly by Andor Lilienthal and Igor Bondarevsky). In June 1941, Stolberg was in fourth place in Rostov-on-Don (the 13th USSR-ch semi-final), when the German attack on the Soviet Union interrupted the event.

Stolberg joined the Soviet Army at the end of 1940, and disappeared on 16 May 1942 in the battle of Malaya Zemlya (lit. "Minor Land"), waged against German troops.

His Brother, Vladimir Stolberg, also served in the Soviet army. He fortunately made it back.

See also
List of people who disappeared

References

1922 births
1940s missing person cases
1942 deaths
20th-century chess players
Jewish chess players
Missing in action of World War II
Missing person cases in Russia
Russian chess players
Russian Jews
Soviet chess players
Soviet military personnel killed in World War II
Sportspeople from Rostov-on-Don